Alfred Edward Whelan (6 December 1929 – 22 June 2015) was a champion player for the Port Adelaide Football Club winning seven premierships during his career. He was the first Port Adelaide player to reach 200 league games.

Whelan went to Le Fevre Boys Technical School.

Whelan won Port Adelaide's best and fairest award in 1956 and finished runner-up in the award on two other occasions.

References

1929 births
2015 deaths
Australian rules footballers from South Australia
South Australian Football Hall of Fame inductees
Port Adelaide Football Club (SANFL) players
Port Adelaide Football Club players (all competitions)